Camborne Trelowarren is an electoral division of Cornwall in the United Kingdom and returns one member to sit on Cornwall Council. The current Councillor is Paul White, an Independent. The current division is distinct from that of the same name used from 2013 to 2021, after boundary changes at the 2021 local elections.

Councillors

2013-2021

2021-present

2021-present division

Extent
The current division represents the centre and south of the town of Camborne.

Election results

2021 election

2013-2021 division

Extent
The former division represented the centre and east of the town of Camborne, as well as part of Tuckingmill (which is shared with the Pool and Tehidy and Camborne Roskear divisions), covering 110 hectares in total.

Election results

2017 election

2013 election

Notes

References

Camborne
Electoral divisions of Cornwall Council